USAT Sea Scamp was a Type C3 ship S-A2 troop transport that saw service in World War II.

She was launched on 30 April 1943 by Ingalls Shipbuilding in Pascagoula, Mississippi, under a Maritime Commission contract with owner Lykes Brothers Steamship Company.

Voyages
Sailed from Oakland, CA 31 March 1944 for Finschafen, New Guinea arriving 30 April 1944
Sailed from Hilo, Hawaii 14 July 1944 for Saipan, Marianas arriving 11 August 1944
Sailed from San Francisco 17 November 1944 for Hollandia, New Guinea arriving 5 December 1944
Sailed from New Guinea 25 December 1944 for San Francisco, CA arriving 17 January 1945
Sailed from ? on ? for New York City, New York arriving 5 September 1945
Sailed from New York City, New York January 4, 1946 arriving 17 January 1946 in Le Havre
Sailed from Le Havre, France on 28 January 1946 for New York City, New York arriving 9 February 1946
Sailed from England (?) on ? February 1946 for New York City, New York arriving 4 March 1946

The ship was purchased by Matson Line in 1947 and renamed Hawaiian Packer. The historic Kamchatka earthquake 1952 November 4 16:58:26.0 UTC 
Magnitude 9.0 generated a tsunami wave in Honolulu harbor which sent a cement barge from its moorings to collide against the freighter.  It was sold to U.S. Maritime Commission in 1964 and renamed Pecos in 1966. It was scrapped in 1971.

References

 

Ships built in Pascagoula, Mississippi
1943 ships
World War II auxiliary ships of the United States